Frederick Le Gros Clark  (8 February 1811 – 19 July 1892) was a British surgeon.

He was born in Mincing Lane, London, the son of a City merchant.

On 9 September 1841, he married Harriet Ann Willmer at St Marylebone, London. On 15 June 1858, he married Henrietta Drummond at Tenby, Pembrokeshire, Wales.

He died on 19 July 1892 at his home, The Thorns, Sevenoaks, Kent, England.

References

1811 births
1892 deaths
Fellows of the Royal Society
British surgeons
Fellows of the Royal College of Surgeons
19th-century English medical doctors
Medical doctors from London